This is a list of seasons completed by the St. John's Red Storm men's college basketball team.

Seasons

 St. John's vacated 47 games (46 wins and one loss) from 2000 to 2004 after Abe Keita was ruled ineligible.  Official records are 5–15 for 2000–01, 7–11 for 2001–02, 1–13 for 2002–03 and 0–4 for 2003–04.
 Jarvis was fired on December 19, 2003 after beginning the season 24; assistant Kevin Clark finished the season, going 4–17 at the helm.
  Official record at St. John's is 68–77 (53–32 Big East) not counting vacated games.
 Lavin coached the first four games of the season, going 2–2. Dunlap went 11–17 over the remainder of the year.

Notes

St. John's
St. John's Red Storm men's basketball seasons
St. John's Red Storm basketball seasons